In the Mood for Swing is an album by saxophonist/composer Benny Carter recorded in 1987 and released by the MusicMasters label.

Reception

AllMusic reviewer Scott Yanow stated "All 11 of the songs are somewhat obscure and therefore fresh Carter compositions and Dizzy Gillespie sits in with the group for three songs.  ... the solo star throughout is the ageless Benny Carter, who at the age of 80 still seemed to be improving".

Track listing
All compositions by Benny Carter
 "I'm in the Mood for Swing" – 6:48
 "Another Time, Another Place" – 6:18
 "The Courtship" – 4:33
 "Rock Me to Sleep" – 5:12
 "Janel" – 5:25
 "The Romp" – 5:46
 "Summer Serenade" – 4:55
 "Not So Blue" – 7:21
 "You, Only You" – 6:39
 "Blue Moonlight" – 6:06
 "South Side Samba" – 6:43

Personnel 
Benny Carter – alto saxophone
Dizzy Gillespie – trumpet (tracks 2, 8 & 11)
Roland Hanna – piano
Howard Alden – guitar (tracks 1, 3, 5-7 & 11)
George Mraz – bass
Louis Bellson – drums

References 

1988 albums
Benny Carter albums
MusicMasters Records albums